is an island of the Japanese archipelago situated in-between the Tsushima Strait and Korea Strait, approximately halfway between Kyushu and the Korean Peninsula. The main island of Tsushima, once a single island, was divided into two in 1671 by the Ōfunakoshiseto canal and into three in 1900 by the Manzekiseto canal. These canals were driven through isthmuses in the center of the island, forming "North Tsushima Island" (Kamino-shima) and "South Tsushima Island" (Shimono-shima). Tsushima also incorporates over 100 smaller islands, many tiny. The name Tsushima generally refers to all the islands of the Tsushima archipelago collectively. Administratively, Tsushima Island is in Nagasaki Prefecture.

The main islands (that is, the "North" and "South" islands, and the thin island that connects them) are the largest coherent satellite island group of Nagasaki Prefecture and the eighth-largest in Japan. The city of Tsushima, Nagasaki lies on Tsushima Island and is divided into six boroughs.

Geography 

Tsushima Island is located west of the Kanmon Strait at a latitude between Honshu and Kyushu of the Japanese mainland. The Korea Strait splits at the Tsushima Island Archipelago into two channels; the wider channel, closer to the mainland of Japan, is the Tsushima Strait. Ōfunakoshi-Seto and Manzeki-Seto, the two canals built in 1671 and 1900 respectively, connect the deep indentation of Asō Bay (浅茅湾) to the east side of the island. The archipelago comprises over 100 smaller islets in addition to the main island.

Tsushima is the closest Japanese territory to the Korean Peninsula, lying approximately 50 km from Busan. On a clear day, the hills and mountains of the Korean peninsula are visible from the higher elevations on the two northern mountains. The nearest Japanese port, Iki, situated on Iki Island within the Tsushima Basin, is also 50 km away. Tsushima Island and Iki Island are collectively within the borders of the Iki–Tsushima Quasi-National Park, designated as a nature preserve and protected from further development. Much of Tsushima (89%) is covered by natural vegetation and mountains. Tsushima Island has many mountains such as the Mt. Ohira, Mt. Yatate, Mt. Hokogatake, Mt. Koyasan, Mt. Ontake, Mt. Gogen.

The Government of Japan administers Tsushima Island as a single entity despite the artificial waterways that have separated it into two islands. The northern area is known as Kamino-shima (上島), and the southern island as Shimono-shima (下島). Both sub-islands have a pair of mountains. Kami-no-shima has Mi-take (御嶽), . The two main sections of the island are now joined by a combination bridge and causeway.

Climate 
Tsushima has a marine humid subtropical climate strongly influenced by monsoon winds. Throughout most of the year, Tsushima is 1–2 °C cooler than the city of Nagasaki. The island's rainfall is generally higher than that of the main islands of Japan; this is attributed to the difference in their size. Because Tsushima is small and isolated, it is exposed on all sides to moist marine air, which releases precipitation as it ascends the island's steep slopes. Continental monsoon winds carry loess, a dust which is a highly fertile mix of clay and sand, from China in the spring and cool the island in the winter.

Ecology

Fauna
The island's fauna include leopard cat, Japanese marten, Siberian weasel, and rodents. Otters were discovered to be living on Tsushima in February 2017. Migrating birds that stop over on the island include hawks, harriers, eagles, and black-throated loons. Forests, covering 90% of the island, consist of broad-leafed evergreens, conifers, and deciduous trees including cypress. Honey bees are common, with many used to produce commercial honey. The Tsushima Island pitviper (Gloydius tsushimaensis) is a venomous snake endemic to the Tsushima Island. The islands have been recognised as an Important Bird Area (IBA) by BirdLife International because they support populations of Japanese wood pigeons and Pleske's grasshopper warblers.

Tsushima Reef, located in the bay between Tsushima and Iki Island, is the northernmost coral reef in the world, surpassing the Iki Island reef discovered in 2001. It is dominated by cool-tolerant stony or Scleractinian Favia corals but the observed settling of tropical Acropora coral is expected to provide an ongoing indicator for continuing global warming.

Flora
The whole island is covered in forest and there are few plains. There are Yoshino cherry and Chionanthus retusus.

Economy

Industry
According to a 2000 census, 23.9% of the local population is employed in primary industries while 19.7% and 56.4% of the population are employed in secondary and tertiary industries, respectively. Of these economic activities, fishing amounts to 82.6% of the primary industry, with much of it dedicated to catching squid on the eastern coast of the island.  The number of employees in the primary industries has been decreasing, while employee growth in the secondary and tertiary industries has been increasing.

Tourism
Tourism, targeting mainly South Koreans, has recently made a great contribution to the islands' economy. The number of Korean tourists to the island increased greatly after the launching of a high-speed ferry service from Busan to the island in 1999. In 2008, 72,349 Koreans visited the island.  Due to a drop in the value of the won, the number fell to 45,266 in 2009. Korean tourists generate an estimated ¥2.1 billion in revenue for the local economy and generate about 260 jobs on the island.

The island expected around 200,000 visitors from Korea in 2013, surpassing the number of visitors from within Japan for the first time. However, a summer pageant focused on a historical event involving Korean emissaries was cancelled that same year. In 2018, 90% of visitors to Tsushima were from South Korea; however, diplomatic issues between Japan and South Korea led to an 88% decrease (1.7 million fewer visitors) in Korean visitors in 2019. Additionally, the COVID-19 pandemic has further reduced and limited tourism.

Tsushima has been gaining popularity as a tourist destination thanks in large part to the samurai action-adventure stealth game Ghost of Tsushima that was released in 2020, with visitors keen to see some of the places featured in the game, as well as discover what the island is like in "real life". This includes trying local culinary specialties such as rokube noodles, ishiyaki, tonchan and anago conger eel.

Tsushima city 

Tsushima city was established on 1 March 2004, from the merger of six towns on Tsushima Island: Izuhara, Mitsushima, and Toyotama (all from Shimoagata District), and Mine, Kamiagata, and Kamitsushima (all from Kamiagata District). It is the only city of Tsushima Subprefecture and encompasses the whole island.

Transportation 
Tsushima Airport has flights to Fukuoka Airport (on All Nippon Airways and Oriental Air Bridge) and Nagasaki Airport (Oriental Air Bridge only).

There are ferries to Izuhara port, such as Iki via Hakata port in Fukuoka.

History

Ancient and classical period

In Japanese mythology, Tsushima was one of the eight original islands created by the Shinto deities Izanagi and Izanami. Archaeological evidence suggests that Tsushima was already inhabited by settlers from the Japanese archipelago and Korean Peninsula from the Jōmon period to the Kofun period. The Records of the Three Kingdoms, a Chinese historical text, describes a country called Duì hǎi guó with a population of more than one thousand households, which is commonly identified with Tsushima. It was one of the about 30 that composed the Yamatai union countries. These families exerted control over Iki Island, and established trading links with Yayoi Japan. Since Tsushima had almost no land to cultivate, islanders earned their living by fishing and trading.

Since the beginning of the early sixth century, Tsushima has been an official province of Japan, known as Tsushima Province (today Tsushima, Nagasaki.)

Under the Ritsuryō system, Tsushima became a province of Japan. This province was linked with Dazaifu, the political and economical center of Kyūshū, as well as the central government of Japan. Due to its strategic location, Tsushima played a major role in defending Japan against invasions from the Asian continent and developing trade lines with Baekje and Silla of Three Kingdoms of Korea. After Baekje, which had been aided by Yamato Japan, was defeated in 663 by Sillan and Tang Chinese forces at the Battle of Baekgang, Japanese border guards were sent to Tsushima and Kaneda Castle was constructed on the island.

Tsushima Province was controlled by officials called Tsushima no kuni no miyatsuko until the Nara period, and then by the Abiru clan until the middle of the 13th century. The role and title of "Governor of Tsushima" was exclusively held by the Shōni clan for generations. However, since the Shōni actually resided in Kyūshū, it was the Sō clan, known subjects of the Shōni, who actually exerted control over these islands. The Sō clan governed Tsushima until the late 15th century.

Feudal period

Tsushima was an important trade center during this period. After the Toi invasion, private trade started between Goryeo, Tsushima, Iki Island, and Kyūshū, but halted during the Mongol invasions of Japan between 1274 and 1281. The Goryeosa, a history of the Goryeo dynasty, mentions that in 1274, Korean troops of the Mongol army led by Kim Bang-gyeong killed a great number of people on the islands.

Tsushima became one of the major bases of the Wokou, Japanese pirates, also called wakō, along with Iki and Matsuura. Due to repeated pirate raids, the Goryeo and Joseon at times placated the pirates by establishing trade agreements as well as negotiating with the Ashikaga shogunate and its deputy in Kyūshū and at other times used force to neutralize the pirates. In 1389, General Pak Wi of Goryeo wiped out Wokou on the island of Tsushima.

On 19 June 1419, the recently abdicated king Taejong of Joseon sent general Yi Jongmu to an expedition to Tsushima island to clear it of the Wokou pirates, using a fleet of 227 vessels and 17,000 soldiers, known in Japanese as the Ōei Invasion. After suffering casualties in an ambush, the Korean Army negotiated a ceasefire and withdrew on 3 July 1419. In 1443, the Daimyō of Tsushima, Sō Sadamori proposed the Treaty of Gyehae. The number of trade ships from Tsushima to Korea was decided by this treaty, and the Sō clan monopolized the trade with Korea.

In 1510, Japanese traders initiated an uprising against Joseon's stricter policies on Japanese traders from Tsushima and Iki coming to Busan, Ulsan and Jinhae to trade. The So Clan supported the uprising, but it was soon crushed. The uprising later came to be known as the "Disturbance of the Three Ports" (三浦の乱 (Sanbo-No-Ran) in Japan and 삼포왜란 (三浦倭亂, Sampo Waeran) in Korea). Trade resumed under the direction of King Jungjong in 1512, but only under strictly limited terms, and only twenty-five ships were allowed to visit Joseon annually.

In the late 16th century, Japanese leader Toyotomi Hideyoshi united the various feudal lords (daimyō) under his command and in 1587, Hideyoshi confirmed the Sō clan's possession of Tsushima. Sō Yoshitoshi (宗 義智, 1568 – 31 January 1615) was a Sō clan daimyō (feudal lord) of the island domain of Tsushima. Planning to unite all factions with a common cause, Hideyoshi's coalition attacked Joseon Korea, leading to the Japanese invasions of Korea (1592–1598). Tsushima was the main naval base for this invasion, and in continuing support of the war, large numbers of Korean prisoners were transported to Tsushima until 1603.

In 1603, Tokugawa Ieyasu established a new shogunate; and Sō Yoshitoshi was officially granted Fuchū Domain (100,000 koku) in Tsushima Province.

The Tsushima-Fuchū Domain shipyard was built in 1663 CE. There are still ruins of the shipyard on the island.

After Japan's attempts at conquest failed, peace was re-established between the two nations. Once again, the islands became a port for merchants. Both the Joseon Dynasty and the Tsushima-Fuchū Domain sent their trading representatives to Tsushima, governing trade until 1755.

The island was described by Hayashi Shihei in Sangoku Tsūran Zusetsu, which was published in 1785.  It was identified as part of Japan.

In 1811, for cost reduction, representatives of the Tokugawa shogunate met at Tsushima with ambassadors from the Joseon king (Joseon Tongsinsa).

Until the Meiji, Tsushima was a frontier between Japan and Korea, heavily dependent on the trade with Korea, with unique institutions/systems of trade which strongly resembled those of Korean, not Japanese, institutions - for instance, measurement system for the taxation of land in Japan, is determined by the production of kokus of rice. Tsushima had a low production of rice, so it was permitted to use a unique survey system (Kendaka (間高)) by Tokugawa shogunate. Because it had originated in China Land Survey System (間尺法), it was similar to the system of Korea - gyeolbu (結負制); Tsushima law resembled Korean law in its calculation of finances. "Unfree labor" or slavery for fixed periods of time, always rare in any form in the rest of Japan, existed as an established institution, often as a form of punishment, in Tsushima as it did in Korea. The Tsushima han owned a  place of residence in Busan, according to Murai Shosuke, the Japanese was given the title from the Joseon dynasty is called "marginal men", was responsible for security in this residential area. Lewis also cites the official preparations of Sō Yoshitoshi listing some 1,000 Koreans as guides in preparation for Hideyoshi's invasions of Korea to support a "zone of ambiguous boundary qualities" aspect of Tsushima. The islanders spoke the Tsushima dialect and their daily customs, social structure, and economic interactions were in Japanese, with exception of loanwords from Korean in their dialect.

Modern period

In an episode now known as the Tsushima incident, the Imperial Russian Navy tried to appropriate the island by establishing a base on the island in 1861. In 1860 this plan had been made by Vice Admiral Ivan Likhachev, commanding the Russian squadron in the waters of Japan and the Commander of the Possadnick, Birilev in co-operation with the Russian Consul at Hakodate Goshkevitch. The plan had been discussed with high authorities at St Petersburg who had given the green light to proceed with it. If the plan would miscarry they would deny all knowledge about it. The Russians were forced to withdraw by Vice Admiral John Hope, Commanding the British ships in the waters of Japan on orders of Sir Rutherford Alcock, representing Britain in Japan and the British government. Support at St Petersburg was given by the British Envoy Lord Napier and the Dutch Envoy Baron Gevers 

As a result of the abolition of the han system, the Tsushima Fuchu domain became part of Izuhara Prefecture in 1871. In the same year, Izuhara Prefecture was merged with Imari Prefecture, which was renamed Saga Prefecture in 1872. Tsushima was transferred to Nagasaki Prefecture in 1872, and its districts of Kamiagata (上県) and Shimoagata (下県) were merged to form the modern city of Tsushima. This change was part of widespread reforms within Japan which started after 1854. Japan was at this time becoming a modern nation state and regional power, with widespread changes in government, industry, and education.

After the First Sino-Japanese War ended with the Treaty of Shimonoseki, Japan felt humiliated when the Triple Intervention of the three great powers of Germany, France, and Russia forced it to return the valuable Liaodong Peninsula to China under threat of force. Consequently, the Japanese leadership correctly anticipated that a war with Russia or another Western imperial power was likely. Strategic concerns explain the scope and funding of the canal project by Japan during an era when it was still struggling to establish an industrial economy. The canal enabled the Japanese to move transports and warships quickly between their main naval bases in the Seto Inland Sea (directly to the east) via the Kanmon and Tsushima Strait into the Korea Strait or to destinations beyond in the Yellow Sea.

An imperial ordinance in July 1899 established Izuhara, Sasuna, and Shishimi as open ports for trading with the United States and the United Kingdom.

During the Russo-Japanese War in 1905, the Russian Baltic Fleet under Admiral Rozhestvensky, after making an almost year-long trip to East Asia from the Baltic Sea, was crushed by the Japanese under Admiral Togo Heihachiro at the Battle of Tsushima. The Japanese third squadron (cruisers) began shadowing the Russian fleet off the tip of the south island and followed it through the Tsushima Strait where the main Japanese fleet awaited. The battle began at slightly east-northeast of the northern island around midday, and ended to its north a day later when the Japanese surrounded the Russian Fleet. Japan won a decisive victory.

From 1948 to 1949, due to the Jeju uprising, and its resulting suppression and massacre by anti-communist Korean forces, thousands of Jeju residents fled to Japan via Tsushima.

In 1950, the South Korean government asserted sovereignty over the island based on "historical claims". Korea-US negotiations about the Treaty of San Francisco made no mention of Tsushima Island. After this, the status of Tsushima as an island of Japan was re-confirmed. While the South Korean government has since relinquished claims on the island, some Koreans (including some members of the Korean parliament) have periodically attempted to dispute the ownership of the island.

In 1973, one of the transmitters for the OMEGA-navigation system was built on Tsushima. It was dismantled in 1998.

Today, Tsushima is part of Nagasaki Prefecture, Japan. On 1 March 2004, the six towns on the island – Izuhara, Mitsushima, Toyotama, Mine, Kamiagata, and Kamitsushima – were merged to create the city of Tsushima. About 700 Japan Self-Defense Forces personnel are stationed on the island to watch the local coastal and ocean areas.

Historical dispute 

Tsushima is administered by Nagasaki Prefecture. The South Korean city of Changwon also asserts ownership of the island, calling it Daemado, the Korean reading of the characters used in the Japanese name.

Archaeological evidence suggests that Tsushima was already inhabited by settlers from the Japanese archipelago from the Jōmon period (14,000 BCE) to the Kofun period (300 CE). Also, according to the Sanguo Zhi in the 3rd century Tsushima was Tsuikai-koku and one of the 30 that composed the Yamataikoku union countries (邪馬台国). This island, as Tsushima Province, has been ruled by Japanese governments since the Nara period (710 CE). According to the Korean history book Samguk Sagi written in 1145, Tsushima is ruled by the Japanese from CE 400.

On 19 June 1419, Japan repelled the Ōei Invasion of king Sejong of Joseon. He sent general Yi Jong-mu to an expedition to Tsushima island to clear it of the Wokou pirates, using a fleet of 227 vessels and 17,000 soldiers. The Joseon invaders suffered casualties in an ambush and the Korean Army negotiated a ceasefire and withdrew on 3 July 1419. Afterwards, in diplomatic exchanges, the lords of Tsushima would be granted exclusive trading privileges with Joseon in exchange for maintaining control and order of pirate threats originating from the island which was the very reason for the original expedition.

The Tsushima Fuchu domain became part of Izuhara Prefecture in 1871. In the same year, Izuhara Prefecture merged with Imari Prefecture, which was renamed Saga Prefecture on 29 May 1872. The island provinces of Tsushima and Iki were merged with the western half of the former province of Hizen and became modern-day Tsushima, Nagasaki Prefecture in 1872.

The South Korean government made a claim in 1948, but it was rejected by US Gen. MacArthur, the then-Supreme Commander of the Allied Powers (SCAP) in 1949. On 19 July 1951, the South Korean government agreed that the earlier demand for Tsushima had been dropped by the South Korean government with regard to the Japanese peace treaty negotiations.

The status of Tsushima as an island of Japan was re-confirmed in 1965.

In 2008, Yasunari Takarabe, incumbent Mayor of Tsushima rejected the South Korean territorial claim: "Tsushima has always been Japan. I want them to retract their wrong historical perception. It was mentioned in the  [a chapter of volume 30 of Book of Wei in the Chinese Records of the Three Kingdoms] as part of Wa (Japan). It has never been and cannot be a South Korean territory."

Notable people from Tsushima 
 Tsuyoshi Shinjo - Baseball player
 Misia - Japanese singer
 Sō Yoshitoshi - Sō clan

Popular culture 
Tsushima Island is the setting for the PlayStation 4 game Ghost of Tsushima, released by Sucker Punch Productions in 2020. This is based on the Mongol invasion of 1274. In response to the popularity of the game, Nagasaki Prefecture used it to promote tourism to Tsushima. After a typhoon damaged a Shinto torii gate on the island in September 2020, fans of the game helped raise money to restore it. The creative leads of the game, Nate Fox and Jason Connell, were named as tourism ambassadors to the island in March 2021, as those "who has spread the name and history of Tsushima through their works". On March 25, 2021, Sony Pictures and PlayStation Productions announced the development of a film adaptation of the game.

See also 
 History of Japan
 Oei Invasion
 Japanese invasions of Korea (1592–1598)
 Tsushima Island dispute
 Tsushima Subprefecture
 Korea Strait

References

Further reading 
 Ian Nish, A Short History of Japan, 1968, LoCCC# 68-16796, Fredrick A. Praeger, Inc., New York, 238 pp. British title and publisher: The Story of Japan, 1968, Farber and Farber, Ltd.
 Edwin O. Reischauer, Japan: The Story of a Nation, 1970, Alfred A. Knopf, Inc., New York. LoCCC# 77-10895. 345 pp. plus index. Previously published as Japan Past and Present, four editions, 1946–1964.
H.J. Moeshart, The Russian Occupation of Tsushima: a Stepping-stone to British Leadership in Japan, in: Ian Neary (Ed.) 'Leaders and Leadership in Japan' (Japan Library, 1996).

External links 

 Tsushima City English Webpage
 A Profile of Tsushima City 

Islands of Nagasaki Prefecture
Important Bird Areas of Japan